Cohen Griffith (born 26 December 1962) is a Guyanese former professional footballer who played as a midfielder.

Playing career
Born in Georgetown, British Guiana, Griffith began his career at Kettering Town before moving to Cardiff City in October 1989 for £60,000 as a replacement for Jimmy Gilligan. He made his debut for the Bluebirds against Huddersfield Town and scored after just nineteen minutes. Mostly playing as a winger for Cardiff until he moved into a defensive midfield position later in his spell at the club. He eventually left the club in 1995 on a free transfer to Barry Town, helping the side to a treble in the 1996–97 season winning the Welsh Premier League, Welsh Cup and Welsh League Cup, including scoring both goals in the 2–1 Welsh Cup final win over Cwmbran Town.

Coaching career
After his retirement Griffith moved into coaching and holds a UEFA B licence. He has worked in coaching schemes in the United Kingdom and Australia. He helps run a health and fitness suite at Ystrad Mynach College.

In February 2008 he took over as manager of Troedyrhiw but stepped down as manager in May 2009.

References

External links
Cohen Griffith's business website

1962 births
Living people
Afro-Guyanese people
Sportspeople from Georgetown, Guyana
Guyanese footballers
Association football midfielders
English Football League players
Cymru Premier players
Kettering Town F.C. players
Cardiff City F.C. players
Barry Town United F.C. players
Rhayader Town F.C. players
Guyanese football managers
Troedyrhiw F.C. managers